Edward Hogg (born 26 January 1979) is an English actor, known for portraying Jesco White in White Lightnin', Stephen Turnbull in Bunny and the Bull, Eugene Mathers in Indian Summers, Segundus in Jonathan Strange & Mr Norrell, Michael 'Godders' Godfrey in Taboo, and Thomas Haxby in Harlots.

Background
Hogg, the second of four children, was born in Doncaster and brought up in Sheffield. He went to Wales High School. His mother is a teacher and his father a retired civil engineer. As a teenager, Hogg was a member of several bands, including post-punk group Porno King, in which he was the lead singer. When the band split, he joined an amateur dramatics group, Sheffield MISTCO, with his younger sister, transferring his love of performance to acting.

Hogg trained at the Royal Academy of Dramatic Art between 1999 and 2002.

Hogg has stated that his acting hero is Al Pacino and the director who he would most like to work with is Paul Thomas Anderson.

When asked what medium he preferred, Hogg chose theatre over film. He was quoted as saying: "I like being in film, I like going to watch a film, and I'm in it, and going 'wow' but, actually, I think doing the physical kind of acting, being on stage, is better. Because it's happening, it's instant, there and then all the time."

Career
Hogg made his professional debut in a production of My Father's Son at the Sheffield Crucible. His other theatre work includes the inaugural production of King Lear at the RSC Academy, Loot at the Bristol Old Vic, and the title role in Woyzeck, both at London's Gate Theatre, and off Broadway. Other credits include Measure for Measure, The Tempest, The Last Days of Judas Iscariot and Rock 'n' Roll. Hogg has also appeared in The Pillowman and Our Class, both at the National Theatre.

On television, Hogg has appeared in Doctors, Heartbeat and Silent Witness. He has lent his voice to the radio dramas Metropolis, Boxing Clever, Serjeant Musgrave's Dance and The Loop.

Hogg made his film debut in Nicholas Nickleby (2002), playing the younger version of David Bradley's character, Mr Bray. He played his first film lead role in White Lightnin''' (2009), as Jesco White. Hogg's other film credits include Alfie (2004), Song of Songs (2006), Bunny and the Bull (2009) and the short films Veteran and Shades of Beige.

Hogg played the role of Robert Cecil in Anonymous (2011), directed by Roland Emmerich. He also appeared in Ollie Kepler's Expanding Purple World (2010), Isle of Dogs (2010) and Me or the Dog (2011), directed by Abner Pastoll. In 2012 Hogg starred in Tom Shkolnik's debut feature, the drama The Comedian.

Hogg played the part of Segundus in the seven-part miniseries Jonathan Strange & Mr Norrell, screened on BBC One in 2015.

In January 2017, Hogg starred in the television period drama Taboo alongside Tom Hardy. He plays Michael Godfrey. Taboo was renewed for a second season. In March 2017, Hogg starred in the television period drama Harlots as Thomas Haxby. Harlots has been renewed for a second season.

Edward portrayed Romeo at Shakespeare's Globe Theatre in London, directed by Daniel Kramer in the summer of 2017. In summer 2018, he played Orlando in As You Like It at the Regent's Park Open Air Theatre.

His upcoming films include Barnaby Southcombe's Scarborough and Abner Pastoll's A Good Woman Is Hard to Find.

Awards and recognition
Hogg was awarded a Commendation at the 2005 Ian Charleson Awards for his performance in the Gate Theatre, London production of Woyzeck. He was nominated for Most Promising Newcomer at the British Independent Film Awards 2009 for his role in White Lightnin''', and won Best Actor awards at the Monterrey and Mumbai Film Festivals for the same role.

In 2010, Hogg was the UK recipient of the Shooting Stars Award at the Berlin Film Festival, and of the Chopard/Premiere Magazine Male Revelation of the Year Award 2010 at the Cannes Film Festival.

Filmography

Films

Television

References

External links
 

1979 births
Living people
Actors from Doncaster
Alumni of RADA
English male stage actors
English male film actors
English male television actors
English male voice actors
21st-century English male actors
Male actors from Sheffield
People educated at Wales High School
Chopard Trophy for Male Revelation winners